John W. O'Boyle (born March 7, 1928) is an American former professional basketball player. He played in five games for the Milwaukee Hawks of the National Basketball Association in 1952–53. He recorded 21 points, 10 rebounds, and 5 assists in his brief career.

Career statistics

NBA

Regular season

Source

References

1928 births
Living people
American men's basketball players
Colorado State Rams men's basketball players
High school basketball coaches in Illinois
High school football coaches in Illinois
Junior college men's basketball players in the United States
Milwaukee Hawks players
Modesto Junior College alumni
Shooting guards
Undrafted National Basketball Association players
Washington Capitols players
Wilkes-Barre Barons players